Eclipse of Reason is a 1947 book by Max Horkheimer, in which the author discusses how the Nazis were able to project their agenda as "reasonable", but also identifies the pragmatism of John Dewey as problematic, due to his emphasis on the instrumental dimension of reasoning.

Summary
Horkheimer deals with the concept of reason within the history of western philosophy. He defines true reason as rationality, which can only be fostered in an environment of free, critical thinking. He details the difference between objective, subjective and instrumental reason, and states that we have moved from the former through the center and into the latter (though subjective and instrumental reason are closely connected). Objective reason deals with universal truths that dictate that an action is either right or wrong. It is a concrete concept, and a force in the world that requires specific modes of behavior. The focus in the objective faculty of reason is on the ends, rather than the means. Subjective reason is an abstract concept of reason, and focuses primarily on means. Specifically, the reasonable nature of the purpose of action is irrelevant - the ends only serve the purpose of the subject (generally self-advancement or preservation). To be "reasonable" in this context is to be suited to a particular purpose, to be "good for something else". This aspect of reason is universally conforming, and easily furnishes ideology. In instrumental reason, the sole criterion of reason is its operational value or purposefulness, and with this, the idea of truth becomes contingent on mere subjective preference (hence the relation with subjective reason). 

Horkheimer argues that modern philosophy has increasingly advocated subjective rationality to the point of rejecting any form of meaning or objective rationality and enabling technocracy. He associates the decline in objective rationality in philosophy with  a mechanical worldview, disenchantment and the decline of a belief in a living or holistic nature. Although he denounces a wide range of contemporary philosophical schools of thought, Horkheimer asserts that these trends are epitomized in positivism, a term he defines broadly. 

Because subjective/instrumental reason rules, the ideals of a society, for example democratic ideals, become dependent on the "interests" of the people instead of being dependent on objective truths. Nevertheless, Horkheimer admits that objective reason has its roots in Reason ("Logos" in Greek) of the subject. He concludes, If by enlightenment and intellectual progress we mean the freeing of man from superstitious belief in evil forces, in demons and fairies, in blind fate – in short, the emancipation from fear - then denunciation of what is currently called reason is the greatest service we can render.

Influence
Horkheimer's argument in Eclipse of Reason that social repression demands the repression of the natural environment and of human nature influenced later developments in ecofeminism.

Bibliography
; reprint Continuum International Publishing Group, 2004,

References

1947 non-fiction books
Books about Nazism
Exilliteratur
Oxford University Press books
Works by Max Horkheimer